Empirical is a British jazz group, formed in 2007. The group performs original compositions with each member being given equal responsibility for the direction of the music.

The members of Empirical are: Nathaniel Facey (alto saxophone), Shaney Forbes (drums), Lewis Wright (vibraphone) and Tom Farmer (bass).

Their albums Empirical (2007), Out ‘n’ In (2009), Elements of Truth (2011), Tabula Rasa (2013) and Connection (2016) were toured Internationally.

Awards

2016 Parliamentary Jazz Awards - BEST ENSEMBLE
2013 Golubovich Jazz Scholars Award
2011 Lewis – Worshipful Company of Musicians YOUNG JAZZ MUSICIAN OF THE YEAR
2010 MOBO awards – BEST JAZZ ACT
2010 Nathaniel – Worshipful Company of Musicians YOUNG JAZZ MUSICIAN OF THE YEAR
2009 Parliamentary Jazz Awards - BEST ENSEMBLE
2009 Shane – Worshipful Company of Musicians YOUNG JAZZ MUSICIAN OF THE YEAR
2007 EBU/European Jazz Competition – WINNER
2007 Peter Whittingham Award – WINNER
2007 Jazzwise – ALBUM OF THE YEAR
2007 Mojo – JAZZ ALBUM OF THE YEAR

References

External links
Empirical official website.
EmpiricalMusicOnline @ YouTube.

British jazz ensembles